Mouns Jones House, also known as the Old Swede's House, is a historic home located in Douglassville, Amity Township, Berks County, Pennsylvania. It was built in 1686, and is a -story, three bay, stone dwelling. It is the oldest surviving house in Berks County and one of the few remaining examples of a Swedish settler's dwelling. The house was restored by the Historic Preservation Trust of Berks County. It is open to the public periodically during the year as part of the Morlatton Village historic site.

It was built by Mans Mouce Jonasson, born in Kingsessing, Philadelphia, 
November 10, 1663, died Amity Township, Berks County, Pennsylvania, March 29, 1727, and his wife Ingeborg Lycan (September 5, 1665 in Gunnarskog, Sweden - December 17, 1749 in Amity Township, Berks County, Pennsylvania, daughter of Peter Lycan. Mans Mouce Jonasson was the son of the first Governor [need citation] of New Sweden Jonas Nilsson (September 3, 1620 in Dalarna, Sweden - October 23, 1693 in Philadelphia, Pennsylvania).

Mans Mouce Jonassons' great-great-grandson was Francis Duke (November 29, 1783 in Berkley, Virginia - December 8, 1836 in Harpers Ferry, West Virginia) was the speaker of the Virginia House of Delegates from 1812 to 1816.

It was listed on the National Register of Historic Places in 1974.

See also
National Register of Historic Places listings in Berks County, Pennsylvania

References

External links
 Mouns Jones House (Ruins), U.S. Route 422 vicinity, Douglassville, Berks County, PA: 2 photos, 2 measured drawings, and 5 data pages, at Historic American Buildings Survey
 Historic Preservation Trust of Berks County: Mouns Jones House

Historic American Buildings Survey in Pennsylvania
Houses on the National Register of Historic Places in Pennsylvania
Houses completed in 1716
Houses in Berks County, Pennsylvania
National Register of Historic Places in Berks County, Pennsylvania
1716 establishments in Pennsylvania
Swedish-American history
Swedish-American culture in Pennsylvania
New Sweden